Paul Jerome "P. J." Carey (November 4, 1953 – December 7, 2012) was an American professional baseball player, manager, instructor, and farm system official.

In , Carey served as senior advisor, player development, of the Los Angeles Dodgers of Major League Baseball.

Carey was born in Scranton, Pennsylvania. He graduated from Scranton Preparatory School in 1971 and attended the University of Scranton before signing his first professional contract with the Philadelphia Phillies in 1972. His four-year playing career was spent at the Rookie, Short Season-A and Class A levels of the Philadelphia organization, where he batted .215 in 143 total games. From 1976 through 1979, Carey coached on Phillies' farm teams before launching his managerial career in 1980 with the Bend Phillies of the Short Season-A Northwest League.

He served as a coach on the Rockies' Major League staff in 1997.

References

External links
Baseball Reference Profile
The Baseball Cube Profile

1953 births
2012 deaths
Asheville Tourists managers
Auburn Phillies players
Baseball players from Pennsylvania
Billings Mustangs managers
Colorado Rockies (baseball) coaches
Los Angeles Dodgers executives
Major League Baseball bullpen coaches
Sportspeople from Scranton, Pennsylvania
Pulaski Phillies players
Rocky Mount Phillies players
Spartanburg Phillies players